Dharanidhar Jena  was an Indian politician. He was elected to the Lok Sabha, the lower house of the Parliament of India from the Bhadrak in Odisha as a member of the Swatantra Party.

References

External links
  Official biographical sketch in Parliament of India website

1921 births
Swatantra Party politicians
India MPs 1971–1977
Lok Sabha members from Odisha
Possibly living people